Stagnicola bonnevillensis is a species of air-breathing freshwater snail, an aquatic pulmonate gastropod mollusk in the family Lymnaeidae, the pond snails.

Distribution
This species of pond snail is endemic to the United States.

References

Lymnaeidae
Endemic fauna of the United States
Gastropods described in 1884
Taxonomy articles created by Polbot